The Continuing Anglican movement, also known as the Anglican Continuum, encompasses a number of Christian churches, principally based in North America, that have an Anglican identity and tradition but are not part of the Anglican Communion.

These churches generally believe that traditional forms of Anglican faith and worship have been unacceptably revised or abandoned within some churches of the Anglican Communion, but that they, the Continuing Anglicans, are preserving or "continuing" both Anglican lines of apostolic succession and historic Anglican belief and practice.

The term was first used in 1948 to describe members of the Church of England in Nandyal who refused to enter the emerging Church of South India, which united Anglican and some Protestant churches in India. Today, however, the term usually refers to the churches that descend from the Congress of St. Louis, at which the foundation was laid for a new Anglican church in North America. Some church bodies that predate the Congress of St. Louis or are of more recent origin have referred to themselves as "Continuing Anglican," although they have no connection to the Congress of St. Louis and do not adhere to all of its principles.

Relations with the Anglican Communion
Continuing Anglican churches were formed by clergy and lay people who left churches belonging to the Anglican Communion. The Continuing Anglican churches believe that those churches have been compromised by adopting secular cultural standards and liberal approaches to theology. Continuing Anglicans generally believe that the faith of some churches in communion with the Archbishop of Canterbury have become either heretical or heterodox and therefore have not sought to be affiliated with the Anglican Communion. Although the term Anglican historically refers also to those churches in communion with the Church of England and the Archbishop of Canterbury, many Continuing churches, particularly those in the United States, use the term Anglican to differentiate themselves from the Episcopal Church of the United States, which they consider to be heterodox.

At the 1998 Lambeth Conference, Resolution IV.11, Continuing Churches, was added, which asked the Archbishop of Canterbury and the Primates' Meeting to consider how best to initiate and maintain dialogue with such groups with a view to the reconciliation of all who own the Anglican tradition.

Theological unity and diversity

Anglicanism in general has always sought a balance between the emphases of Catholicism and Protestantism, while tolerating a range of expressions of evangelicalism and ceremony. Clergy and laity from all Anglican churchmanship traditions have been active in the formation of the Continuing Anglican movement.

There are high church, broad church, and low church Continuing Anglican jurisdictions. Some are Anglo-Catholic with richly ceremonial liturgical practices. These include the Anglican Province of Christ the King, the Anglican Catholic Church, the Anglican Province of America, and the Anglican Church in America. Others that belong to a more Evangelical tradition, such as the United Episcopal Church of North America, support the Thirty-Nine Articles and, in some parishes, alternate Morning Prayer with Holy Communion.

The Continuing churches in the United States reject the 1979 revision of the Book of Common Prayer made by The Episcopal Church and instead use the American 1928 version or earlier official versions of the Book of Common Prayer for their services.

Liturgical use of the 1611 Authorized Version of the Bible (known in the United States as the King James Version) is also a common feature. This is done for many reasons, including aesthetics, and in opposition to what the churches regard as liberal or progressive theology which is said to characterize some translations of more recent origin.

The Affirmation of St. Louis, conceived at the Congress of St. Louis (September 14–16, 1977) by over 2000 concerned bishops, clergy, and laypeople, and, to a lesser extent, the Thirty-nine Articles of Religion, serve as a standard of faith and unity for most Continuing churches.

History

Origins
The Continuing Anglican movement originated in the Episcopal Church in the United States of America and the Anglican Church of Canada. Related churches in other countries were founded later.

In 1976, the General Convention of the Episcopal Church in the United States of America voted to approve the ordination of women to the priesthood and to the episcopate and also provisionally adopted a new and doctrinally controversial Book of Common Prayer, later called the 1979 version. During the following year, 1977, several thousand dissenting clergy and laypersons responded to those actions by meeting in St. Louis, Missouri, under the auspices of the Fellowship of Concerned Churchmen, and adopting a theological statement, the Affirmation of St. Louis. The Affirmation expressed a determination "to continue in the Catholic Faith, Apostolic Order, Orthodox Worship, and Evangelical Witness of the traditional Anglican Church, doing all things necessary for the continuance of the same."

Out of this meeting came a new church with the provisional name "Anglican Church in North America (Episcopal)." The first bishops of the new church, later named the Anglican Catholic Church, were consecrated on January 28, 1978, in Denver, Colorado.

In Denver, the first bishop of the new church, Charles Dale David Doren, formerly the Archdeacon of the Diocese of Taejon in South Korea, was consecrated by the Rt Rev’d Albert Arthur Chambers, formerly the Episcopal Church's Bishop of Springfield (PECUSA #588)

Joining Bishop Chambers in the consecration of Charles Doren was the Rt Rev’d Francisco de Jesus Pagtakhan of the Philippine Independent Catholic Church. Letters of Consent and Desire for the Doren consecration were in hand from the Rt Rev’d Mark Pae (Taejon, Korea) and Rt Rev'd Charles Boynton. The newly consecrated Charles Doren then joined with Chambers and Pagtakhan in consecrating as bishops James Orin Mote, Robert S. Morse, and Peter Francis Watterson. Watterson left the movement shortly afterward and became a Roman Catholic priest.

The 2007/08 Directory of Traditional Anglican and Episcopal Parishes, published by The Fellowship of Concerned Churchmen, contained information on over 900 parishes affiliated with either the Continuing Anglican churches or the Anglican realignment movement.

Early fractures and realignment
During the process of ratifying the new church's constitution, disputes developed that split its dioceses into two American churches and a separate Canadian church. These were the Anglican Catholic Church led by James Orin Mote, the Diocese of Christ the King (now the Anglican Province of Christ the King) led by Robert S. Morse, and the Anglican Catholic Church of Canada. In 1981, Charles Doren and others left the Anglican Catholic Church to found the United Episcopal Church of North America in opposition to the alleged inhospitality of the other jurisdictions towards low churchmen.

In 1983, a statement of unity led to the coalescence of the Anglican Catholic Church. In 1984 a portion of the Anglican Episcopal Church of North America merged with the ACC to become the non-geographical Diocese of St. Paul.

In 1991 a number of parishes left the Anglican Catholic Church to merge with the American Episcopal Church and form the Anglican Church in America. Some of those later formed the Anglican Province of America after the resignation of Bishop Anthony F. M. Clavier as bishop ordinary of Diocese of the Eastern United States (ACA). In 1997 additional parishes left the Anglican Catholic Church and formed the Holy Catholic Church (Anglican Rite).

In 1999, Bishop Richard Boyce requested membership in the Anglican Province of America as the Diocese of the West, and in 2003 the Anglican Rite Synod in the Americas (ARSA) under Bishops Larry Shaver (formerly of the American Episcopal Church and the Anglican Jurisdiction of the Americas) and Herbert M. Groce were received into the Anglican Province of America as the non-geographical Diocese of St. Augustine, later renamed the Diocese of Mid-America.

On March 5, 2003, Ash Wednesday, the Diocese of the Holy Cross seceded from the Anglican Province of Christ the King over questions surrounding the successor of Robert S. Morse, James Provence. On July 25, 2007, Bishop Rocco Florenza and most of the parishes in the Eastern Diocese of the Anglican Province of Christ the King withdrew, joining the Anglican Church in America.

International growth
Some Continuing Anglican bodies have added dioceses outside North America. The two largest international jurisdictions are the Traditional Anglican Church and the Anglican Catholic Church. The Traditional Anglican Church comprises national provinces with dioceses, parishes and missions in Australia, Canada, Colombia, Great Britain, Guatemala, India, Ireland, Salvador, South Africa, the United States, Zambia, Zimbabwe, and Venezuela.

The Anglican Catholic Church has a presence on six continents and nearly two dozen countries. In 1984 the five dioceses of the Church of India (CIPBC) were received by the Anglican Catholic Church and constituted as its second province, but they rescinded communion between 2013 and 2017 over matters relating to the status of the second province and became independent. In 2018, Archbishop Mark Haverland and the Most Rev. John Augustine, Metropolitan of the CIPBC, signed an agreement restoring communio in sacris. In September 2021, by a vote of the provincial synod of the Anglican Catholic Church, a third province, the Province of Southern Africa, was established, comprising five dioceses in South Africa and the one diocese in Zimbabwe.

The Anglican Province of America also includes global partnerships, with links to congregations in Ecuador, Haiti, Philippines, and India.

Reunification efforts 

Grassroots partnerships have been formed between parishes in geographical regions. The Anglican Fellowship of the Delaware Valley, so named because it encompassed Anglican churches and missions within the Delaware Valley, was formed in 2003 and was led by Bishop Paul C. Hewett of the Diocese of the Holy Cross. It was an association of Anglican churches in Pennsylvania, Delaware, and New Jersey that subscribed to the Affirmation of St. Louis and affiliated with Forward in Faith-UK. In 2005, the Anglican Fellowship of the Delaware Valley sponsored the conference The Affirmation of St. Louis: Seeking a Path to Reconciliation and Unity, which brought together traditionalists in the Episcopal Church and members of the continuing movement to discuss a path to jurisdictional unity. In 2006, representatives from seven Anglican churches announced the formation of Common Cause Appalachia, an alliance of Anglican churches in the Appalachian area of the Southeast United States, to which some continuing Anglican churches in Georgia, Kentucky, North Carolina, and Tennessee belonged.

ACC-APCK-UECNA 
From 2003 to 2011, the Anglican Catholic Church (ACC), the Anglican Province of Christ the King (APCK), and the United Episcopal Church of North America (UECNA) explored opportunities for greater cooperation and the possibility of achieving organic unity. In 2003, Archbishop John-Charles Vockler of the ACC in a letter, called for prayers for healing of the damaged relations between the ACC and the APCK. On May 17, 2007, Archbishop Mark Haverland of the ACC signed an intercommunion agreement negotiated with the United Episcopal Church of North America. In July, Archbishop Haverland published a statement on church unity, calling on UECNA and the Anglican Province of Christ the King to join him in building "full organic unity." Bishop Presley Hutchens of the ACC addressed delegates at the UECNA convention in October 2008 and discussed the possibility of uniting the ACC and UECNA. Although well received at the time, there was a feeling among many of the delegates that the proposal was being rushed, and that no proper consideration was being given to the theological, constitutional, and canonical issues thrown up by the move. In January 2009, one bishop from each jurisdiction consecrated three suffragan bishops in St. Louis, intending that they serve all three jurisdictions. Moves towards unity with the Anglican Catholic Church were referred for further discussion and subsequently stalled in 2011 by the decision of UECNA to remain an independent jurisdiction.

Approaches and responses to the Roman Catholic Church
One Continuing Anglican church body, the Traditional Anglican Communion (TAC), sought reunion with the Roman Catholic Church. In 2004, Archbishop John Hepworth of the TAC reported that based on eight years of dialogue Rome could recognize the TAC as an Anglican church in full communion with the Holy See. In 2007, the TAC made a formal proposal to the Roman Catholic Church for admission into "full corporate and sacramental union" with that church in a manner that would permit the retention of some of its Anglican heritage. The Vatican announced on July 5, 2008, that it was giving serious consideration to appeals received from various Anglican groups seeking union with itself, observing that "the situation within the Anglican Communion in general has become markedly more complex." On October 29, 2009, the Congregation for the Doctrine of the Faith announced Pope Benedict XVI's intention to create a new type of ecclesiastical structure, called a "personal ordinariate", for groups of Anglicans entering into full communion with the see of Rome. The initial response to this announcement was not entirely positive.

On November 4, 2009, Pope Benedict XVI signed an apostolic constitution, Anglicanorum coetibus. The House of Bishops of the Anglican Church in America – the American province of the TAC – responded on March 3, 2010, voting unanimously to request acceptance under the personal ordinariate provision. Within months, however, a majority of the eight ACA bishops made known their opposition to the move, and the church declared its intention to remain a Continuing Anglican body.

The Most Rev. Mark Haverland (ACC) wrote a response to Anglicanorum coetibus, declining to participate. While the Most Rev. Walter H. Grundorf (APA) offered an initial cautious welcome of Rome's offer, there was no interest for the Anglican Province of America as an institution to join.

Common Cause Partnership 
Through the Federation of Anglican Churches in the Americas, the Anglican Province of America was associated with the Common Cause Partnership, an organization seeking to unite various Anglican jurisdictions to form a new conservative province of the Anglican Communion in North America. But when, in July 2008, the APA voted to delay a decision on its membership until a number of contentious issues were resolved in the Common Cause Partnership, including whether or not to accept the practice of ordaining women, the APA's Diocese of the West disaffiliated. It subsequently joined the Reformed Episcopal Church and, through her, the Common Cause Partnership. On March 4, 2009, the Anglican Province of America (APA) reorganized its Diocese of the West (DOW) with parishes that had chosen not to follow Richard Boyce out of the APA.

North American Anglican Conference and UECNA 
The Anglican Episcopal Church and the Diocese of the Great Lakes formed the North American Anglican Conference for mutual assistance between "Biblical Anglican" churches. A suffragan bishop was consecrated for the Anglican Episcopal Church in late 2008 by its presiding bishop and three bishops of the Diocese of the Great Lakes. In July, 2014, the Diocese of the Great Lakes, under Bishop David Hustwick, joined the UECNA as its diocese for the Great Lakes states and eastern Canada. In January, 2015, a petition was received from Bishop George Conner of the Anglican Episcopal Church at the behest of that jurisdiction's standing committee asking for admission as a non-geographical diocese of the UECNA. This was granted on February 11, 2015.

Anglican Joint Synods – G-4 to G-3 
In January 2016, the Anglican Catholic Church, the Anglican Church in America, the Anglican Province of America, and the Diocese of the Holy Cross reached a formal accord. Forming the Anglican Joint Synods, a "Group of 4" churches, called the G-4, pursuing eventual corporate unity. A joint synod was planned for all four jurisdictions to discuss common mission and unity.

On October 6, 2017, the Anglican Church in America, the Anglican Catholic Church, the Anglican Province of America, and the Diocese of the Holy Cross signed a communio in sacris agreement at jointly held synods in Atlanta, Georgia, pledging to pursue full, institutional, and organic union.

On October 13, 2017, Archbishop Shane Janzen, then primate of the Traditional Anglican Communion and Metropolitan of the Anglican Catholic Church of Canada, together with Bishop Craig Botterill, released a statement expressing the hope that the "initiative will lead to further ecumenical dialogue, cooperation and reconciliation between and among the Continuing Anglican Churches around the world, as well as here in Canada".

In 2019, a joint mission and evangelism ministry called Continuing Forward was formed for these G-4 jurisdictions. All four were represented at a second joint synod held January 13–17, 2020 in Atlanta.

On September 23, 2021, the Diocese of the Holy Cross voted to join the Anglican Catholic Church as a non-geographical diocese, making the "Group of 4" a "Group of 3" (G-3) churches.

On February 16, 2022, the primates of the Anglican Province of America and the Traditional Anglican Church announced the establishment of a full communion agreement between the two traditional Anglican churches. On May 22, 2022, Rogation Sunday, the Anglican Province of America and the Traditional Anglican Church officially signed the agreement of full sacramental communion at Saint Barnabas Cathedral, Dunwoody, Georgia.

Dialogue with the Polish National Catholic Church 
A dialogue between the G-3 (at the time, G-4) churches and the Polish National Catholic Church (PNCC) was opened, resulting from the desire to restore the kind of intercommunion that the PNCC had shared with the Protestant Episcopal Church in the United States. The meetings began after representatives of the PNCC were invited to attend the Anglican Joint Synods of the G-4 in 2017. The dialogue has addressed various issues and ways the churches can continue to grow closer together and achieve unity.

The first official dialogue was held January 15, 2019, in Dunwoody, Georgia. The jurisdictions of the G-4 were represented by their presiding bishops and archbishops from the Anglican Catholic Church, the Anglican Church in America, the Anglican Province of America, and the Diocese of the Holy Cross. Also in attendance was a bishop of the Anglican Catholic Church of Canada (ACCC). The PNCC was represented by three bishops, including Prime Bishop Anthony Mikovsky and Bishop Paul Sobiechowski, and two senior priests. The four met again in 2020, 2021, and 2022 in order to advance the dialogue.

As a part of the ACC's worldwide efforts with the Union of Scranton, meetings have been held between the Nordic Catholic Church and the ACC Diocese of the United Kingdom.

As of October 2022, G-3 representatives were also in attendance with the bishops of the PNCC at the 125th anniversary and General Synod of the Polish National Catholic Church in Scranton, Pennsylvania.

Churches
There have been occasional surveys of "orthodox" Anglican churches conducted by the Fellowship of Concerned Churchmen, with numbers reported from 2007 and 2011 and 2015.

The following is a list of denominations that derive from the Congress of St. Louis and the January 28, 1978, consecrations. The approximate number of their North American parishes and missions is shown in parentheses.
Anglican Catholic Church (including Diocese of the Holy Cross) (97)
Anglican Catholic Church of Canada (12)
Anglican Church in America (41)
Anglican Province of America (47)
Anglican Province of Christ the King (37)
Holy Catholic Church (Anglican Rite) (6)
Traditional Anglican Church of Canada (9)
United Episcopal Church of North America (24)

Other Continuing Anglican churches 
Other church bodies commonly called "Continuing Anglican" were founded independently of the Continuing Anglican movement of the 1970s, some before and others later. Among these are the Free Church of England (the first congregations of which were founded in 1844), the Reformed Episcopal Church (founded in 1873), the Orthodox Anglican Church (founded in 1963 as the Anglican Orthodox Church), and the Southern Episcopal Church (founded in 1965).

 American Anglican Church (13)
 Anglican Orthodox Church (5)
 Christian Episcopal Church of North America (4)
 Episcopal Missionary Church (19)
 Orthodox Anglican Church (15)
 Southern Episcopal Church (3)
 United Anglican Church

Defunct churches 
Other churches that emerged from the jurisdictions derived from the Congress of St. Louis, or merged with existing jurisdictions, or otherwise ceased.

 American Episcopal Church (1970 - 1991)
 Anglican Episcopal Church of North America (1972 - 1984)
 Anglican Rite Jurisdiction of the Americas (1981 - ?)
 Anglican Rite Synod in the Americas (? - 2003)
 Anglican Rite Synod of America
 Anglo-Catholic Church in the Americas (2000 - 2009)
 Traditional Protestant Episcopal Church (1991 - 2011)

See also

Anglican realignment
Bartonville Agreement
Federation of Anglican Churches in the Americas
Continuing church
Convergence Movement
Independent sacramental movement

References

Further reading
 de Catanzaro, Carmino J., Bp. Anglican Catholic: What's in a Name? Westmount, Qué.: Anglican Catholic Church of Canada, Parish of Saint Athanasius, [198-?], Without ISBN
de Catanzaro, Carmino J., Bp. Why on Earth [is there] the Church? Westmount, Qué.: Anglican Catholic Church of Canada, [198-?]. Without ISBN
Dees, James P., Bp. Reformation Anglicanism: an address ... on the Occasion of the Dedication of Cranmer Seminary ... Sept. 19, 1971 ... of the Anglican Orthodox Church. Statesville, N.C.: Anglican Orthodox Church, 1971. [21] p., col. ill.
The League of Independent Episcopal Parishes (LIEP), sponsored by the Traditional Episcopal Church. Spring Hill, Flor.: League of Independent Episcopal Churches, [199-]. N.B.: No personal author or specific committee is credited for the text of this pamphlet.
Palmer, Roland F. The Anglican Catholic Church of Canada: Questions & Answers. Westmount, Qué.: Anglican Catholic Church of Canada, [198-?]. Without ISBN
The Traditional Episcopal Church. Spring Hill, Flor.: Traditional Episcopal Church, [199-]. N.B.: No personal author or specific committee is credited for the text of this pamphlet.
Gallo, Michael F. "The Continuing Anglicans: Credible Movement or Ecclesiastical Dead End?" Touchstone Magazine, Winter, 1989.
Divided We Stand: A History of the Continuing Anglican Movement by Douglas Bess, Tractarian Press, 2002, . Revised edition, Apocryphile Press, September 2006, 
The Continuum and Its Problems, A Paper Delivered By Wallace Spaulding To The Fellowship of Concerned Churchmen, September 2009.
Warner, C. V. (2010). Recognizing Anglican Catholic identity: an historical review of the Anglican Catholic Movement, the affirmation of St. Louis and the traditional Anglican Communion. https://scholar.acadiau.ca/islandora/object/theses:3832
Miller, D. A. (2011). A “Continuing” Anglican Congregation: St George's Church, Las Vegas, 22 August 2010, 12th Sunday after Trinity. Anglican and Episcopal History, 80(1), 74–78. http://www.jstor.org/stable/42612658
Andrews, Robert M. (2022). Continuing Anglicanism? The History, Theology, and Contexts of “The Affirmation of St Louis” (1977). Journal of Religious History, 46(1), 40–60. https://doi.org/10.1111/1467-9809.12821

External links
List of churches not in the Anglican Communion at anglicansonline.org, with weblinks for most of the Continuing Anglican churches and some other non-Anglican churches.
The Measure of A Bishop: The Episcopi Vagantes, Apostolic Succession, and the Legitimacy of the Anglican "Continuing Church" Movement.  A master's degree thesis, written by a student at Gordon-Conwell Theological Seminary, containing historical information on Continuing Anglican and related churches.
Shelter in the Storm Safe Church List of traditional/Orthodox Anglican churches
Fellowship of Concerned Churchmen Directories of Parishes & Jurisdictions
Anglican Taxonomy by William J. Tighe

 
Anglican Church of Canada

Episcopal Church (United States)
LGBT and Anglicanism